Watch Out is a 2008 film directed by Steve Balderson and starring Matt Riddlehoover. It is based on the novel by Joseph Suglia. Though the story is set in Benton Harbor, Michigan, the film was shot guerrilla-style, without permits, in March and April on location in Wamego, Kansas.

The film premiered at the Raindance Film Festival in London, where it was nominated for Best International Feature. It was released theatrically in the "Stop Turning Me On" world tour in New York (Coney Island Film Festival), Nashville, Chicago, Washington D.C (Reel Affirmations Festival), Seattle (Lesbian & Gay Film Festival), San Francisco, Asheville, Charlottesville (Virginia Film Festival), Kansas City, Lawrence KS, Austin (Alamo Drafthouse), and Los Angeles.

Festivals 
 2008 Raindance Film Festival - Nominee Best International Feature
 2008 8th Annual Coney Island Film Festival
 2008 Reel Affirmations Film Festival
 2008 Seattle Lesbian & Gay Film Festival
 2009 Boston Underground Film Festival

External links 
 
 Official website – www.WatchOutFilm.com

2008 comedy-drama films
2008 films
American LGBT-related films
2000s English-language films
American comedy-drama films
LGBT-related comedy-drama films
2008 LGBT-related films
2000s American films